Sir John Anthony Grant (29 May 1925 – 9 October 2016) was a British Conservative politician who served as a Member of Parliament (MP) from 1964 until his retirement in 1997.  He was knighted for political and public service in the 1983 New Year Honours.

Early life
He attended St Paul's School, London, and Brasenose College, Oxford. He served in the Army from 1943–1948 as a captain in the Third Dragoon Guards (3rd Carabiniers) and became a solicitor in 1952.

Parliamentary career
Grant first contested Hayes and Harlington, unsuccessfully, in 1959. He was Member of Parliament (MP) for Harrow Central from 1964 to 1983. The Harrow Central constituency was abolished during boundary changes just before the 1983 general election. During this procedure, he competed unsuccessfully with Hugh Dykes, the sitting MP for Harrow East, for the nomination for the much enlarged Harrow East constituency. He then sat for Cambridgeshire South West from 1983 until he retired in 1997.

He served as Parliamentary Secretary to the Board of Trade and Parliamentary Under-Secretary at the Department of Trade and Industry in the Heath government of 1970 to 1974, and was a strong supporter of small businesses. From 1974 to 1976 he served as a Vice-Chairman of the Conservative Party. He did not serve in Margaret Thatcher's administrations, but won the admiration of 'wet' Tory colleagues.  In the view of Alan Clark, he “always hated her and the values she stood for”. In his own words, Anthony Grant said he admired Thatcher but "did not hit it off with her enormously".  He served on Select Committees and sponsored the Lloyd's Act 1982

He spoke little in the House of Commons, but would on occasion ensure that any credit for Addenbrooke's Hospital went to his constituency and not to Cambridge.

Personal life
He married Sonia Isobel Landen, daughter of George and Winifred Landen, in 1954 and they had a son and daughter.  He twice served as Master of the Guild of Freemen of the City of London, in 1979/80 and 1997/98. He died on 9 October 2016 at the age of 91.

Notes

References

External links 
 

1925 births
2016 deaths
British Army personnel of World War II
Conservative Party (UK) MPs for English constituencies
English solicitors
Knights Bachelor
Grant, John Anthony
Grant, John Anthony
Grant, John Anthony
Grant, John Anthony
Grant, John Anthony
Grant, John Anthony
Grant, John Anthony
Grant, John Anthony
Grant, John Anthony
Alumni of Brasenose College, Oxford
People educated at St Paul's School, London
Parliamentary Secretaries to the Board of Trade
Politicians awarded knighthoods
20th-century English lawyers